Marylinka secunda is a species of moth of the family Tortricidae. It is found in Santa Catarina, Brazil.

The wingspan is about 10 mm. The ground colour of the forewings is glossy greyish white, suffused with pale brownish yellow in the basal portion of the wing. In the postmedian portion it is suffused with brownish. The hindwings are brownish.

Etymology
The species name refers to the number of species in the genus Marylinka.

References

Moths described in 2007
Cochylini